Rabya Kulsoom is a Pakistani television and film actress. She has played a role of Maria in Shehr-e-Malal. Aside from television, she has appeared in music videos like "Pyar Hua" and "Main Kashmir Hoon". She will also be seen in upcoming feature film Gawah Rehna and was also star in web series Ek Jhoothi Love Story.

Personal life
Rabya Kulsoom is the daughter of television actress Parveen Akbar and sister of Faizan Shaikh. Actress Maham Aamir is her sister in law. She married singer Rehan Nizami in 2018. The couple had blessed with a son in 2021.

Life And Career 
Rabya Kulsoom started her acting career in 2018 with a drama series 'Hara Dil', and she also has an art background that inspired him to become an actor. After completing her dental degree in Karachi, she practiced for many years, but her passion to become an actor made her join acting. In just one year, she has won the hearts of many and is trying to prove himself as her legendary mother Parveen Akbar.

In 2018, Rabya tried her hand at the drama series 'Hara Dil' alongside Hiba Bukhari and Danish Taimoor. The first series of him turned out to be a great decision, as she received immense love and appreciation from everyone, after which she appeared in another 3 series in the same year. Her performance in the drama series 'Dil Ara' along with many new and experienced actors also got a good response. She is ready to make her big screen debut.

Filmography

Television

Web

Film

Music video

References

External links 

Rabya Kulsoom on Youtube

Living people
Pakistani television actresses
Year of birth missing (living people)